Leonhard Stock (born 14 March 1958) is a former World Cup alpine ski racer from Austria.

Career
Stock earned his first World Cup points at age 18 in January 1977. At the 1980 Winter Olympics in Lake Placid, Stock was originally an alternate for the downhill, but his fast training times on the course at Whiteface Mountain earned him a spot on the four-man Austrian team. On race day, he was the ninth racer on the course and posted the fastest time to win the gold medal.

Stock could not repeat his surprise win at the Lake Placid Olympics on the World Cup tour until almost a decade later, winning downhill races in 1989, 1990, and 1992. At the 1988 Winter Olympics in Calgary, he just missed a second Olympic medal, finishing fourth in the downhill and eighth in the Super-G at Nakiska.

In 1997 he took over his parental (farm)house in Finkenberg and converted it into a hotel. With his brother Hans he also runs a sports and fashion store in that town.

World Cup victories
 3 wins (3 DH), 27 podiums

World championship results 

From 1948 through 1980, the Winter Olympics were also the World Championships for alpine skiing.

Olympic results

References

External links
 
 

1958 births
Living people
Austrian male alpine skiers
Olympic alpine skiers of Austria
Olympic gold medalists for Austria
Olympic medalists in alpine skiing
Medalists at the 1980 Winter Olympics
Alpine skiers at the 1980 Winter Olympics
Alpine skiers at the 1984 Winter Olympics
Alpine skiers at the 1988 Winter Olympics
Alpine skiers at the 1992 Winter Olympics
Recipients of the Decoration of Honour for Services to the Republic of Austria